Jason Mohammad (born 17 September 1973) is a Welsh radio and television presenter currently working for the BBC. He is the current host of Final Score on BBC One on Saturday afternoons.

Personal life
Mohammad was born and brought up in Cardiff to a Pakistani father and Welsh mother, going to school at Glyn Derw High School. He studied Welsh and Politics at Swansea University, and then attended Cardiff University for a postgraduate diploma in broadcast journalism. He is a practising Muslim.

Career

Television
Mohammad joined BBC Cymru Wales in 1997 as a reporter for BBC Wales Today before becoming the anchor of Wales on Saturday. In 2013, he replaced Gabby Logan as the host of Final Score on BBC One on Saturday afternoons, regularly hosting alongside pundits such as Garth Crooks and Danny Mills. Mohammad had previously been a reporter on the programme for many years. He was also the presenter of Scrum V specials on BBC Two Wales and was the secondary snooker presenter for BBC Sport. Mohammad was part of the BBC's broadcasting crew at the Rio 2016 Summer Olympics and is an occasional presenter of Match of the Day and Match of the Day 2, deputising for Gary Lineker and Mark Chapman respectively. He previously hosted some of the BBC's live coverage of the RBS Six Nations, although they now share the live rights with ITV, leaving John Inverdale and Gabby Logan to present the live action.

Radio
Before getting his break into the world of journalism, Jason was a member of Radio City 1386AM, The Abertawe Bro Morgannwg University Health Board radio service based in Singleton Hospital. Mohammad hosts a show on Monday to Wednesday mornings on BBC Radio Wales. In October 2017 he sat in for Clare Balding on her BBC Radio 2 show Good Morning Sunday. From the start of the 2016–17 football season, Mohammad has been the co-host of BBC Radio 5 Live's football phone in show 606, alongside regular co-host Robbie Savage. He is also an occasional presenter of 5 live Sport.From 4 February 2018, he became the regular co-presenter of Good Morning Sunday, alongside Kate Bottley.

Remuneration
On 3 July 2019, the BBC disclosed that Jason Mohammad was paid £355,000 in the previous year, among the top ten earners at the BBC.

References

External links
 

Jason Mohammad (BBC Radio Wales)
Good Morning Sunday (BBC Radio 2)
Jason Mohammad Bio Elite Management

1973 births
Living people
Journalists from Cardiff
Alumni of Swansea University
Alumni of Cardiff University
Welsh people of Pakistani descent
British Muslims
British male journalists
British television presenters
BBC newsreaders and journalists
BBC Radio 2 presenters
BBC sports presenters and reporters
BBC Radio Wales presenters